Georg Schneider (born 4 October 1959) is a German former footballer who played as a midfielder.

Career
Schneider made his professional debut for SC Freiburg in the 2. Bundesliga on 13 February 1982, coming on as a substitute in the 58th minute for Adalbert Grzelak against Fortuna Köln. The home match at the Dreisamstadion in Freiburg im Breisgau finished as a 3–1 win. In total, Schneider made 14 appearances for Freiburg during the 1981–82 season.

References

External links
 
 
 

1959 births
Living people
German footballers
Association football midfielders
TSV 1860 Munich II players
Offenburger FV players
SC Freiburg players
2. Bundesliga players